Yejide Kilanko (born 1975) is a Nigerian Canadian fiction writer and social worker. She is known for addressing violence against women in her work. Her debut novel, Daughters Who Walk This Path, was a Canadian fiction bestseller in 2012.

Early life and education 
Kilanko was born in 1975 in Ibadan, Nigeria, where her father worked as a university professor. She began writing poetry at a young age. She studied political science at the University of Ibadan.

Move to Canada and social work career 
In 2000, Kilanko left Nigeria, marrying an American and immigrating to Laurel, Maryland, in the United States. She then moved in 2004 to Canada, where she now lives in Chatham-Kent, Ontario.

In Canada, she studied social work at the University of Victoria and the University of Windsor. She works as a therapist in children's mental health.

Writing 
Kilanko initially focused on poetry, later turning to fiction. She was prompted to write her first novel after struggling with vicarious trauma from hearing about the experiences of the children she works with as a mental health counselor.

Her debut book, Daughters Who Walk This Path, was published in 2012. Set in her hometown of Ibadan, it deals with sexual assault and violence against women and children in Nigeria, told through the eyes of a child narrator. It was described by reviewers as breaking boundaries on the taboo of discussing sexual violence, particularly in Nigeria.

Daughters Who Walk This Path was a Canadian national fiction bestseller for several weeks. It was featured on the Globe and Mail's list of 100 best books of 2012. In 2014, the Nigerian author Chimamanda Ngozi Adichie recommended it for summer reading in the Guardian.

Her novel was also shortlisted for the Nigeria Prize for Literature in 2016, after it was released there by a Nigerian publisher. The prize eventually went to Abubakar Adam Ibrahim for his book Season of Crimson Blossoms.

Her subsequent work of fiction, the novella Chasing Butterflies, was published in 2015 as a fundraiser for Worldreader. It also discusses violence against women, focusing on domestic violence. 

In 2018, she published a children's book, There Is an Elephant in My Wardrobe, which is intended to help children with anxiety.

Her manuscript for her subsequent novel, which "fictionalizes the stories of female Nigerian nurses living in the United States who were murdered by their much older husbands," was shortlisted for Canada's Guernica Prize for Literary Fiction in 2019 under the working title Moldable Women . It was published in 2021 as A Good Name.

Kilanko identifies as a feminist and describes her work as inherently feminist. She says she is particularly influenced by African and African American women writers such as Buchi Emecheta, Chika Unigwe, Toni Morrison, and Alice Walker.

Selected works 

 Daughters Who Walk This Path (2012)
 Chasing Butterflies (2015)
 There Is an Elephant in My Wardrobe (2018)
 A Good Name (2021)

References 

1975 births
Nigerian women writers
21st-century Canadian women writers
Nigerian women novelists
Canadian women novelists
Canadian people of Nigerian descent
Nigerian social workers
Canadian social workers
Living people
People from Ibadan
University of Victoria alumni
Nigerian feminists
University of Windsor alumni
Black Canadian women
Writers from Ontario
21st-century Canadian novelists
Black Canadian writers